Gerhard Lusenti (24 April 1921 – June 1996) was a Swiss football defender who played for Switzerland in the 1950 FIFA World Cup. He also played for SC Young Fellows Juventus and AC Bellinzona.

References

External links
FIFA profile

1921 births
1996 deaths
Swiss men's footballers
Switzerland international footballers
Association football defenders
AC Bellinzona players
1950 FIFA World Cup players
Swiss football managers
AC Bellinzona managers
Footballers from Zürich